Bert Frederick Williams MBE (31 January 1920 – 19 January 2014) was an English international football goalkeeper. Nicknamed The Cat, he spent the majority of his playing career at Wolverhampton Wanderers where he won the League Championship and FA Cup. At the time of his death Williams was the oldest living England international.

Early career
Williams started playing competitive football as a young man when he was a member of the 19th Wolverhampton Company of The Boys' Brigade (Bradley Methodist Church). He was then offered the chance to play for Walsall's reserves, whilst playing for Thompson's FC, the works team of the local factory he was employed at. He was taken on permanently and turned professional in April 1937.

The outbreak of World War II halted his progress, after two seasons of playing, as he joined the RAF, serving as a Physical Training instructor. He found time in between his duties to turn out as a guest for both Nottingham Forest and Chelsea in friendlies.

Wolves and England
With the conflict over, Williams resumed his career by signing for First Division Wolverhampton Wanderers in September 1945 for £3,500. He immediately became first choice at the Molineux club, making his official debut when league football resumed on 31 August 1946 in a 6–1 win over Arsenal, a game that was also the Wolves début of Johnny Hancocks.

He gained his first honour in 1949 as the team lifted the FA Cup after defeating Leicester City. His part in winning this prize saw him rewarded with an England call-up later that month, as he made his international debut on 22 May 1949 in a 3–1 friendly win in France. He held onto the goalkeeper's jersey through the 1950 FIFA World Cup, and at that tournament played in England's surprise defeat by the USA.

He won the league title with Wolves in 1953–54. In total, he made 420 appearances for Wolves.

After football
After ending his football career, he ran a sports shop in Bilston, a sporting centre and lived near Shifnal in Shropshire.

Williams was appointed Member of the Order of the British Empire (MBE) in the 2010 Birthday Honours for services to football and to charity.

Honours
 Football League First Division: 1953–54
 FA Cup: 1949

References

External links
England Profile

1920 births
2014 deaths
Military personnel from Staffordshire
Association football goalkeepers
English footballers
England international footballers
England wartime international footballers
1950 FIFA World Cup players
Walsall F.C. players
Wolverhampton Wanderers F.C. players
People from Bilston
English Football League players
Members of the Order of the British Empire
Royal Air Force Physical Training instructors
Nottingham Forest F.C. wartime guest players
English Football League representative players
Royal Air Force airmen
Royal Air Force personnel of World War II
FA Cup Final players